The 1st Cornwall MRC Formula 1 Race was the first Cornwall MRC motor race, run to Formula One rules, held on 7 June 1954 at the Davidstow Circuit, Cornwall. The race was run over 20 laps of the little circuit, and was won by British driver John Riseley-Prichard in a Connaught Type A.

This was the first of three Formula One races held in Cornwall during 1954 and 1955, and was the first Formula One event to include a Kieft on the grid, driven by Horace Gould.

Gould later caused the entire meeting to be ended prematurely when he crashed his car transporter (a converted double-decker bus) into a footbridge, bringing it down on to the track.

Results

References

 Race results at www.silhouet.com 

Cornwall MRC Formula 1 Race, I
Cornwall MRC Formula 1 Race
Corn
1950s in Cornwall